Curveulima dautzenbergi is a species of sea snail, a marine gastropod mollusk in the family Eulimidae. The species is one of a number within the genus Curveulima. The species was named in honor of Belgian malacologist, Philippe Dautzenberg (1849-1935).

Description
The shell measures approximately 4 mm.

Distribution
This species occurs in the following locations:
 Irish Exclusive Economic Zone
 United Kingdom Exclusive Economic Zone

References

External links
  Pallary, P. (1900). Coquilles marines du littoral du département d'Oran. Journal de Conchyliologie. 48(3): 211-422.

Eulimidae
Gastropods described in 1900